Provincial Road 363 is a very short provincial road in the Municipality of Roblin, Manitoba, Canada.

Provincial Road 363 starts at PTH 83  kilometres south of San Clara and terminates at the Saskatchewan - Manitoba border just east of Togo, where it continues as Highway 5. PR 363 serves as a connector from PTH 83 to Highway 5, which is a major east-west highway within the province of Saskatchewan.

References

External links 
Manitoba Official Map - West Central

363